Castelbottaccio is a comune (municipality) in the Province of Campobasso in the Italian region Molise, located about  north of Campobasso as the crow flies but 36 kilometres by road.

Castelbottaccio borders the following municipalities: Civitacampomarano, Lucito, Lupara, and Morrone del Sannio.

References

Cities and towns in Molise